Urdu Bazaar, Karachi is a bazaar located in Saddar Town, Karachi, Pakistan. It is considered as one of the oldest and most prestigious historical book markets in Pakistan.

A variety of books, both used and new books, are available in the market, including books on art, history, literature, philosophy, religion, and science.

Urdu Bazaar is also known for its book festival.

History
Dating back to the Mughal era, Urdu Bazaar was founded in the 1950s in Karachi. Originally, the marketplace was composed of just a few stalls operated by immigrants, but it gradually grew and moved to M.A Jinnah Road Saddar where it can still be found.

References

Bazaars in Karachi
1950s establishments in Pakistan
Tourist attractions in Karachi